Nattali Rize (born Natalie Magdalena Chilcote) is an Australian-born, Jamaican-based musician, record producer and social activist. In 2003, as Natalie Pa'apa'a, on lead vocals and lead guitar, she was joined by her domestic partner, Carlo Santone, on bass guitar and percussion, to form Blue King Brown, an urban roots ensemble, in Byron Bay.
She relocated to Jamaica in mid-2014, adopted her new performance name and in March 2015 collaborated with local group, Notis, to issue a single, "Rebel Love". It was followed by a nine-track extended play, New Era Frequency (7 August 2015). Rize's first solo album, Rebel Frequency, was released in March 2017.

She issued a single, "Rebel Love", in collaboration with local group, Notis; it was co-written by Rize, Wayne Thompson, Patterson, Sellton and Wels. They toured the US in support of Michael Franti. The collaborators followed with a nine-track EP, New Era Frequency (7 August 2015). Her first album, Rebel Frequency, was released in March 2017.

She also performed in several playing for change songs.

References

External links 

 

Year of birth missing (living people)
Living people
People from New South Wales
Australian musicians